Andrija Kačić Miošić (17 April 1704 – 14 December 1760) was a Croatian poet and Franciscan friar, descendant of one of the oldest and most influential Croatian noble families - Kačić.

Biography
Born in Brist near Makarska, he became a Franciscan friar. He was educated in Zaostrog monastery and Buda. He used to teach philosophy in Zaostrog and Sumartin on Brač.

His most important work is Razgovor ugodni naroda slovinskog (Pleasant Conversation of Slavic People, 1756), a history in verse, in which Kačić Miočić, influenced by the ideals of the Enlightenment, tried to spread literacy and modern ideas among common people. It was the most popular book in the Croatian-speaking lands for more than a century. It also played a key role in the victory of the Shtokavian dialect as the standard Croatian language. It contain poems about Skanderbeg which were basis for tragedy Skenderbeg written by Ivan Kukuljević Sakcinski in the 19th century. They were also basis for Život i viteška voevanja slavnog kneza epirskog Đorđa Kastriota Skenderbega written by Jovan Sterija Popović in 1828.

Using the ten-syllable verse of folk poetry and relying on Mavro Orbini and Pavao Ritter Vitezović, Kačić Miošić narrates and sings about the history of the Slavic peoples from the antiquity to his age. He, like Ivan Gundulić, describes the Slavic peoples from the Adriatic to the North Sea as one people. The book exalts many heroes from the famous Croatian families of the age of the Ottoman wars. His most important work also contained a lot of references and praise for the Bosniak nation and its historical events. Since the book includes some important folk poems, many readers considered it a folk songbook.

Pleasant Conversation is mostly didactic in tone and of little artistic value, but later it served as a valuable source of historic data. It gave inspiration for future Croatian writers.

His other works are a philosophical study in Latin and a chronicle called Korabljica (1760), where he used passages from other writers, including Vitezović.

References

External links

 Short biography 

1704 births
1760 deaths
Croatian Franciscans
18th-century Croatian poets
Kačić
People from Dalmatia